The Taff Vale Railway U and U1 classes were 0-6-2T steam tank locomotive  operated by Taff Vale Railway, Wales, from 1895. All were still in use when the Taff Vale Railway was acquired by the Great Western Railway in 1922, but were withdrawn from traffic between 1927 and 1931.

Overview
Tom Hurry Riches, the Taff Vale Railway's Locomotive Superintendent brought out 2 similar classes, the U and the U1 for working passenger trains, both 0-6-2Ts.

The main differences from the mixed traffic engines were larger diameter driving wheels, a longer wheelbase and replacing the usual four bar motion with single bar.

Accidents and incidents

On 23 January 1911 locomotive No. 193 was hauling a passenger train which was in a rear-end collision with a freight train at Hopkinstown, Glamorgan. Eleven people were killed and five were injured.

Numbering

See also
 Welsh 0-6-2T locomotives
 Locomotives of the Great Western Railway

References

Source

U
0-6-2T locomotives
Vulcan Foundry locomotives
Railway locomotives introduced in 1895
Standard gauge steam locomotives of Great Britain
Scrapped locomotives